Squalius agdamicus is a cyprinid fish endemic to the lower Kura basin in Azerbaijan.

References

Squalius
Fish described in 1901